Aphelidesmidae is a family of polydesmidan millipedes distributed in Central America, the Caribbean and northern South America.

Description
Aphelidesmids are often large and colorful, but many are dorsally dark with yellow tips on the scutes.

See also
Amplinus bituberculosus

References

Polydesmida
Millipede families